Penguinone is an organic compound with the molecular formula . Its name comes from the fact that its 2-dimensional molecular structure resembles a penguin.

The suffix "-one" indicates that it is a ketone. The systematic name of the molecule is 3,4,4,5-tetramethylcyclohexa-2,5-dienone.

Although it is a dienone and thus has the necessary structure for a dienone–phenol rearrangement, the methyl groups in positions 3 and 5 of the ring block the movement of the group at position 4, so even the action of trifluoroacetic acid will not cause transformation to a phenol.

See also
List of chemicals with unusual names
NanoPutian
Penguin diagram

References

Ketones
Cyclohexadienes